Seppo Sakari Jokinen (born 13 April 1949) is a Finnish writer of crime fiction.

His books' main character is the fictional police officer Sakari Koskinen from Hervanta, Tampere. Koskinen is divorced and has a son named Antti. The books are published by CrimeTime.

Jokinen himself was born in Tampere. He spent nearly four years in Australia after serving in the army in the early 1970s. He was for many years the main operator in the Tampere city IT centre.

The novel Hukan enkelit was published in English in 2012 as Wolves and Angels by Ice Cold Crime.

Awards 

 Tampereen kaupungin kirjallisuuspalkinto 1997 ja 2000
 Olga ja Vilho Linnamon Säätiön tunnustuspalkinto 1998
 Kariston Säätiön tunnustuspalkinto 2000
 Vuoden johtolanka -palkinto 2002
 Suuren Suomalaisen Kirjakerhon tunnustuspalkinto 2003

Memberships 

 Pirkkalaiskirjailijat ry 1996
 Suomen Kirjailijaliitto ry 1999
 Suomen Näytelmäkirjailijaliitto ry 2003

Books

Sakari Koskinen series 
 Koskinen ja siimamies. Karisto, 1996. 
 Koskinen ja raadonsyöjä. Karisto, 1997. 
 Koskinen ja pudotuspeli. Karisto, 1998. 
 Koskinen ja taikashow. Karisto, 1999. 
 Koskinen ja kreikkalainen kolmio. Karisto, 2000. 
 Hukan enkelit. Karisto, 2001. . (Wolves and Angels, Ice Cold Crime, 2012)
 Piripolkka. Karisto, 2002. 
 Vilpittömässä mielessä. Karisto, 2003. 
 Suurta pahaa. Karisto, 2004. 
 Sana sanaa vastaan. Karisto, 2005. 
 Hiirileikki. Karisto, 2006. 
 Viha on paha vieras. Karisto, 2007. 
 Kuka sellaista tekisi. Karisto, 2008. 
 Lyöty mies. Karisto, 2009. 
 Räätälöity ratkaisu. Karisto, 2010. 
 Ajomies. Crime Time, 2011. 
 Hervantalainen. Crime Time, 2012 
 Vihan sukua. Helsinki: Crime Time, 2013. 
 Mustat sydämet. Helsinki: Crime Time, 2014. 
 Kuolevaksi julistettu. Helsinki: Crime Time, 2015. 
 Rahtari. Helsinki: Crime Time, 2016. 
 Vakaasti harkiten. Helsinki: Crime Time, 2017. 
 Lyödyn laki. Helsinki: Crime Time, 2018.

References 

1949 births
Living people
People from Tampere
Writers from Pirkanmaa
Finnish crime writers
Finnish crime fiction writers